Cromartyshire is a historic county in the Highlands of Scotland, comprising the medieval "old shire" around the county town of Cromarty and 22 enclaves and exclaves transferred from Ross-shire in the late 17th century. The largest part, six times the size of the old shire, is Coigach, northwest from Ullapool. In 1890, Cromartyshire was merged with Ross-shire into the administrative county of Ross and Cromarty, which in 1975 was merged into the new council area of Highland.

History
The medieval sheriffdom of Cromarty encompassed a single tract on the north of the Black Isle peninsula. The sheriffdom was hereditary in Clan Urquhart. It comprised the parish of Cromarty; most of the adjacent parish of Kirkmichael, excluding a portion at Balblair where a ferry crossed the Cromarty Firth to Invergordon; and a single farm in Cullicudden parish.  As late as the mid-nineteenth century, ownership of the moor of Mulbuie was uncertain between Cromartyshire and Ross-shire.

Cromartyshire originally bordered Inverness-shire, but in 1504 Ross-shire was formed out of the nearest parts of Inverness-shire, and its boundaries were fixed in 1661.  In 1662, Kirkmichael and Cullicudden parishes merged to form the parish of Resolis.

The feudal barony of Cromarty, whose appurtenant land was coterminous with the county, was purchased from the Urquharts in 1682 by the Mackenzies of Tarbat. They owned scattered lands in Ross-shire, including the barony of Tarbat on the Moray Firth north of the Black Isle. In 1685 Sir George Mackenzie, recently made Viscount of Tarbat and later elevated to Earl of Cromartie, secured two Acts of the Parliament of Scotland transferring his lands in Easter Ross from Ross-shire to Cromartyshire. These were enumerated as:
the barony of Tarbat and all therein incorporated, ... also Little Farness and others his lands within the barony of Delny, together with the lands of Wester St Martins, Easter Balblair and the ferry belonging to George Dallas of St Martins 
And:
his lands of Pittonachie, Beneckfield, Avoch, Castleton, Auchterflow, Hauldoks, Killen, Raddery, Balmeechy, Little Suddey and his lands about Chanonry and Rosemarkie
Although this was repealed in 1686 on the grounds that some lands not belonging to Viscount Tarbat had been included, it was re-enacted in 1690 to include only "the said barony of Tarbat and all other lands in Ross-shire belonging in property to the said viscount". The transfers increased the area and rateable value of Cromartyshire by respective factors of fifteen and three.

Cromartyshire was the smallest constituency in the Parliament of Scotland, with only five freeholders electing its two Commissioners in 1703. After the Act of Union 1707, Cromartyshire sent one MP to Westminster alternately with Nairnshire, a nearby small county.  Only six of 19 votes on the register at the last election, in 1831, were found to be genuine freeholders.

The exclaves were for many purposes administered as part of Ross-shire rather than Cromartyshire. 
After the Sheriffs (Scotland) Act 1747, Ross and Cromarty had a common sheriff. 
The 1801 census report listed "Shire of Cromarty" and "Shire of Ross" separately, the former including only the old shire and the latter the exclaves. The 1811 census report listed "Ross and Cromarty" together on the ground that it was impractical to separate them. In 1805, responsibility for maintenance of roads in Ross-shire and Cromartyshire was merged. In 1810, the militia was for Ross-shire in some exclaves and Cromartyshire in others. 
The Scottish Reform Act 1832 merged Cromartyshire's constituency with Ross-shire's to form Ross and Cromarty, returning one MP to Parliament. Police and ratings administration were merged similarly in the Victorian period.

The Local Government (Scotland) Act 1889 provided that "the counties of Ross and Cromarty shall cease to be separate counties, and shall be united for all purposes whatsoever, under the name of the county of Ross and Cromarty." (Ross and Cromarty also absorbed an exclave of Nairnshire and a near-exclave of Inverness-shire; the former was the barony of Ferintosh and the latter an exclave of Kilmorack parish around Muir of Ord railway station.)

Geography

Given the scattered nature of the county it is difficult to generalise. The original shire consisted of a portion of the Black Isle peninsula bordering on Cromarty Firth, across which lay the Tarbat peninsula, of which several portions belonged to Cromartyshire, including Tarbat Ness. The interior sections consist of several enclaves within Ross-shire which are mountainous, remote and sparsely populated. To the west are various sections around Little Loch Broom, including the southern tip of Gruinard Island. North of Loch Broom lies the largest single section of the county, which takes in Ullapool, the Coigach peninsula and a number of small islands in Enard Bay (most notably Sgeir Mhòr, Fraoachlan, Eilean Mòr, Eilean Mòineseach and Green Island) and also the Summer Isles where Loch Broom meets The Minch. This section also contains a number of lochs, most notably Loch na Totaig, Loch Osgaig, Loch Raa, Loch Vatachan, Fionn Loch, Loch Veyatie, Loch Lurgainn, Loch Bad a' Ghaill, Loch Sionascaig, Lochan Tuath, Loch an Doire Duibh, Loch Doire na h-Airbhe, Loch a Ghille, Loch Buine Mhòire, Loch Call an Uidhean, Loch a' Chroisg, Loch Achall, Loch an Daimh, Loch na Maoile, Loch Ob an Lochain, Clar Lochan and Loch an Eilein.

Sources tend to number the tracts added to Cromartyshire at between eight and eleven; however some comprise multiple parcels. In 1807, Alexander Nimmo listed the additions in eight groups with two to six parcels in each.

Ordnance Survey list

The 1881 index to the Ordnance Survey's first edition lists 22 detached parts, and the original "old shire", all of whose areas are given on the six-inch map.

Other sources
Some places not included within Cromartyshire in the Ordnance Survey map are stated by earlier sources to have been within it. The 1859 edition of the Encyclopædia Britannica asserts that Royston Park (now Caroline Park) outside Edinburgh, the city residence of the Viscount Tarbat, was also considered part of Cromartyshire. Nimmo's 1807 list includes:
 "the mortified lands of the town of Fortrose",  two patches totalling less than 50 acres in Rosemarkie parish, which were bequeathed to the burgh of Cromarty. A 1794 account of Rosemarkie parish states that there are two mortifications, but for the poor of Chanonry, not Cromarty.
 Ussie Mills (between Dingwall and Conon Bridge).
 salmon-fishing rights on the River Conon.

Settlements

Achiltibuie
Altandhu
Badenscallie
Cromarty
Dundonnel
Inver
Jemimaville
Kildary
Milton
Polbain
Polglass
Portmahomack
Rieff
Strathpeffer
Ullapool

References

Sources

Citations
Areas shown the first-edition 6-inch maps

Other citations

External links

 
 Cromartyshire on the interactive map of the counties of Great Britain and Ireland — Wikishire
 Index to the Ordnance Survey of Ross-shire and Cromartyshire ca. 1878-1883 indicates all detached parts of Cromartyshire 

Counties of Scotland
Former exclaves
 
States and territories disestablished in 1890
Counties of the United Kingdom (1801–1922)